The men's floor competition at the 2002 Asian Games in Busan, South Korea was held on 1 and 4 October 2002 at the Sajik Gymnasium.

Schedule
All times are Korea Standard Time (UTC+09:00)

Results

Qualification

Final

References

2002 Asian Games Report, Page 435
 Results

External links
 Official website

Artistic Men Floor